Breast growth may refer to:

 The growth of the breast, see breast development
 Mammoplasia, the enlargement of the breast
 A growth inside the breast, see breast lump